Betty Olssen is a former Fijian international lawn bowler.

Bowls career
Olssen has represented Fiji at the Commonwealth Games, in the fours event at the 1986 Commonwealth Games.

She won four medals at the Asia Pacific Bowls Championships including two gold medals in the fours.

References

Fijian female bowls players
Living people
Bowls players at the 1986 Commonwealth Games
Year of birth missing (living people)